The 2010 Drake Bulldogs football team represented Drake University as a member of the Pioneer Football League (PFL) during the 2010 NCAA Division I FCS football season. Led by third-year head coach Chris Creighton, the Bulldogs compiled an overall record of 7–4 with a mark of 6–2 in conference play, placing third in the PFL. In May 2021, Drake played in the 2011 Kilimanjaro Bowl, the first college football game held on the continent of Africa. The team played its home games at Drake Stadium in Des Moines, Iowa.

Schedule

References

Drake
Drake Bulldogs football seasons
Drake Bulldogs football